Terminus Group (Chinese: 特斯联科技集团; pinyin: Tesilian) (aka Terminus) is a Chinese company headquartered in Beijing, China.

History and operations 
Terminus was founded in 2015 by Victor Ai, a Washington University graduate. In 2019, Harvard Business Review recognized Ai as one of the Top 20 digital transformation pioneers in China. The company develops smart buildings, smart communities, and smart retail, while specializing in the development of the AI CITY using its smart city management system - TACOS (Terminus AI CITY Operating System), robotics, Internet of Things (IoT) products, and urban security management tools.

In April 2020, Terminus launched a project to create an AI city in Chongqing, China. It is the world’s first urban digitization pilot project and is currently under construction. Using AI, it will get to know its citizens better.

Terminus plans deploy over 150 robots at Expo 2020 in Dubai, which has been postponed to October 1, 2021, to March 31, 2022 due to the COVID-19 pandemic. Terminus was the only Chinese company selected as the official premier partner of the Expo 2020.

References 

Companies based in Shenzhen